Yelanets Steppe Nature Reserve is a protected nature reserve of Ukraine that covers a section of the largest virgin steppe tract in the Northern Black Sea Coast area.  It is the only steppe reserve in Right-bank Ukraine (the area on the west side of the Dnieper River).   A herd of American bison was introduced and lives within the territory.  The reserve is in Mykolaiv Oblast.

Topography
The reserve is situated on a southern spur of the Dnieper Upland, about 140 km west of the Dnieper River, and 100 km north of the Black Sea coast.  The site began with the set-aside of a 300 hectare plot in 1978; it has been periodically added to over the years to  total 1,675 ha in 2019.  A 1.2 km ecological corridor runs through the middle of the site.  The hilly terrain, with cliffs in places, is due to the karst (limestone) underlying the area.

Climate and ecoregion
Average annual precipitation is 428 mm.

Flora and fauna
The characteristic vegetation of this type of steppe is Festuca valesiaca.  About one-third of the site is recovered agricultural land that is being returned to native local steppe.  615 species of vascular plants have been listed on the reserve.

Scientists working in the reserve have recorded 28 species of mammals including red fox, American bison and roe deer, wild boar, and Bobak marmot, 137 of birds, 6 of reptiles, and 5 species of amphibians. During 1970s, cattles, Turkmenian kulan, spotted deer, and mouflon were also kept with bisons within semi-feral condition.

Public use
As a strict nature reserve, Yelanets Steppe 's primary purpose is protection of nature and scientific study.  Public access is limited: mass recreation and construction of facilities is prohibited as are hunting and fishing.  Park staff lead educational programs for local schoolchildren, and general ecological awareness programs for community.  In the 1970 the site featured a 70-hectare "living zoo" enclosure that has since been removed and the animals relocated.

See also
 Lists of Nature Preserves of Ukraine (class Ia protected areas)
 National Parks of Ukraine (class II protected areas)

References

External links
 Boundaries of Yelanets Steppe Nature Reserve on OpenStreetMap.org 

Nature reserves in Ukraine